A Jewish Community Relations Council (JCRC) is a locally based Jewish organization that carries out "action agendas on behalf of and in the name of the local Jewish communities." Councils may aim "to represent the consensus of the organized Jewish community" in the cities in which they operate, and then assist in consulting other local stakeholders on matters of importance to Jewish community values. In the United States, JCRCs are affiliated with the Jewish Council for Public Affairs (JCPA) organization, and relate to that national organization in a variety of ways.

See also
 Jewish Community Relations Council of Minnesota and the Dakotas
 Sam Dubbin
 David A Rose (judge)
 Robert E. Segal

References

External links
 JCRC of the San Francisco Bay Area
 JCRC of Sacramento (JPAC)
 JCRC of Greater Boston
 JCRC of Washington
 JCRC of St. Louis
 JCRC of New York
 JCRC of Greater Dallas
 JCRC of Greater Indianapolis

Jewish organizations based in the United States